Martin Hall may refer to:

People 
 Martin Hall (rugby league) (born 1968), British rugby league footballer and coach
 Martin Hall (archaeologist), former vice-chancellor at the University of Salford

Places 
 Martin Hall (Hendrix College), Conway, Arkansas, listed on the NRHP in Faulkner County
 Martin Hall (Providence College), Providence, Rhode Island
 Glidden-Martin Hall, Sioux Falls, South Dakota, building listed on the NRHP in Minnehaha County
 Martin Hall at Texas College, Tyler, Texas, building listed on the NRHP in Smith County

See also
Martin Building (disambiguation)
Martin Hotel (disambiguation)
Martin House (disambiguation)

Architectural disambiguation pages